Nadyalee Torres López (born May 8, 1988) is a Puerto Rican model and beauty pageant titleholder who was crowned Miss World Puerto Rico 2013. she represented Puerto Rico at Miss World 2013 but unplaced.

Pageantry

Miss Mundo de Puerto Rico 2013
On April 24, 2013, Nadyalee competed in the Miss Mundo de Puerto Rico 2013 pageant representing the municipality of Caguas where she won the title and she also won the Talent competition in an event held prior to the final night of the pageant.

Miss World 2013
Nadyalee represented Puerto Rico at the Miss World 2013 pageant held on September 28, 2013, in Bali, Indonesia.

References

Living people
People from Aguas Buenas, Puerto Rico
Puerto Rican beauty pageant winners
Miss World 2013 delegates
1988 births